Pudong is a district of Shanghai located east of the Huangpu, the river which flows through central Shanghai. The name Pudong was originally applied to the Huangpu's east bank, directly across from the west bank or Puxi, the historic city center.  It now refers to the broader Pudong New Area, a state-level new area which extends all the way to the East China Sea.

The traditional area of Pudong is now home to the Lujiazui Finance and Trade Zone and the Shanghai Stock Exchange and many of Shanghai's best-known buildings, such as the Oriental Pearl Tower, the Jin Mao Tower, the Shanghai World Financial Center, and the Shanghai Tower. These modern skyscrapers directly face Puxi's historic Bund, a remnant of former foreign concessions in China. The rest of the new area includes the Port of Shanghai, the Shanghai Expo and Century Park, Zhangjiang Hi-Tech Park, Shanghai Pudong International Airport, the Jiuduansha Wetland Nature Reserve, Nanhui New City, and the Shanghai Disney Resort.

History
Pudong—literally "The East Bank of the Huangpu River"—originally referred only to the less-developed land across from Shanghai's Old City and foreign concessions. The area was mainly farmland and only slowly developed, with warehouses and wharfs near the shore administered by the districts of Puxi on the west bank: Huangpu, Yangpu, and Nanshi. Pudong was originally established as a county in 1958 until 1961 which the county was split among Huangpu, Yangpu, Nanshi, Wusong and Chuansha County. On October 1, 1992, the original area of Pudong County and Chuansha County merged and established Pudong New Area.

In 1993, the Chinese government set up a Special Economic Zone in Chuansha, creating the Pudong New Area. The western tip of the Pudong district was designated as the Lujiazui Finance and Trade Zone and has become a financial hub of modern China. Several landmark buildings were constructed, including the Oriental Pearl Tower, and the supertall Jin Mao Building, Shanghai World Financial Center and Shanghai Tower, the world's first trio of adjacent supertall skyscrapers. These buildings—all along Century Avenue and visible from the historic Bund—now form the most common skyline of Shanghai.

On May 6, 2009, it was disclosed that the State Council had approved the proposal to merge Nanhui District with Pudong and comprise the majority of eastern Shanghai. In 2010, Pudong was host to the main venues of the Shanghai Expo, whose grounds now form a public park.

Pudong New Area consist of the original Pudong County (northeastern portion of Shanghai County), Chuansha County, and Nanhui County.

Government
Districts of the Direct-Controlled Municipality of Shanghai are administratively on the same level as prefecture-level cities. However, the government of Pudong has a status equivalent to that of a sub-provincial city, which is a half-level above a prefecture-level city. This is due to Pudong's size and importance as the financial hub of China. The Pudong Communist Party Secretary is the top office of the district, followed by the district governor of Pudong.  The Pudong party chief is customarily also a member of the Shanghai Party Standing Committee.

On April 27, 2015, the People's Government of Pudong New Area is working with China (Shanghai) Pilot Free-Trade Zone Administrative Committee.

Demographics
Pudong is bounded by the Huangpu River in the west and the East China Sea in the east. Pudong is distinguished from Puxi ("West Bank"), the older part of Shanghai. Currently, at least 2.1 million of residents of Pudong are newcomers from other provinces or cities in China.

Pudong is the most populous district in Shanghai. According to the 2010 Census, it has 5,044,430 people in 1,814,802 families, around 1/4 of Shanghai's total population, an explosive growth since the last census thanks to immigrants. Pudong's resident population growth is well above national average because it is a popular immigration destination. The 2010 census shows a 58.26% increase in the last decade, or an annual pace of 4.7%. In particular, the district saw am immigration growth of 189.5%, or an annual pace of 11.22%.

Excluding immigrants, the birth rate is 0.806% while the death rate is 0.729, resulting a net growth of 0.077%. The total fertility rate is 1.03, well below the replacement level. The district actually has a negative registered household population growth if immigrants are excluded, thus the growth is purely driven by immigration.

The 2010 Census shows a population density of 3,909/km2. About 3/4 of the population live in the northern part and part of city center called "Northern Territory". 1/4 live in the "Southern Territory" that was the Nanhui District. The Northern Territory has a 6,667 population density, while the Southern Territory has 1,732/km2. Suburbs saw a greater increase in population during 2000–2010 with the help of the city's suburb expansion policy. Some counties in the traditional city center saw a population decrease.

Subdistricts and towns

* – Liuzao town merged into Chuanshaxin town.
** – Luchaogang town and Shengang Subdistrict merged and form Nanhui Xincheng town.

Education

Universities and higher education 

Shanghai Maritime University
Shanghai Dianji University
Shanghai Fisheries University
China Executive Leadership Academy in Pudong
Fudan University in Zhangjiang
New York University Shanghai
ShanghaiTech University

Primary and secondary schools 

Public schools:
 No. 2 High School Attached to East China Normal University
 Jianping High School
 Dongchang High School of ECNU
 Pudong Foreign Languages School of Shanghai International Studies University

International schools:
Dulwich College Shanghai
French School of Shanghai Pudong Campus
Nord Anglia International School Shanghai Pudong
German School Shanghai Pudong Campus
Shanghai American School Pudong Campus
Shanghai Japanese School (SJS) Pudong Campus (elementary and junior high), and SJS Senior High School
Wellington College International Shanghai
Concordia International School Shanghai Pudong Campus

Other private schools:
Shanghai Gold Apple Bilingual School
Shanghai Shangde Experimental School
Shanghai Pinghe School

Economy

With the Nanhui District merger in May 2009, the size of Pudong's economy grew. The district's 2015 gross domestic product amounts to an estimated 789.8 billion RMB (~US$113.5 billion), with services comprising 70% of economic output. Its GDP per capita in terms of purchasing power parity is approximately $50,783. The area is divided into four distinct economic districts. The Jinqiao Export Processing Zone is another major industrial area in Pudong covering  Zhangjiang Hi-Tech Park is a special area for technology-oriented businesses.

The Pudong area continues to experience rapid development, especially in the commercial sector, with 1.3 million square meters of prime office space reaching completion in 2008, more than the previous two years combined. Pudong has also attracted considerable fixed asset and real estate investment, reporting 87.268 billion RMB in fixed asset investment and 27.997 billion RMB in real estate investment in 2008.

The newest Disney resort, with a Disneyland included, is located in Pudong, which is open to tourists in June 2016.

Businesses

Bao Steel has its head office in the Bao Steel Tower in Pudong. Comac has its head office in Pudong. The headquarters of Yangtze River Express, a cargo airline, are in the Pufa Tower in Pudong.

Hang Seng Bank has its mainland offices in the Hang Seng Bank Tower in Pudong. Kroll has an office in the Hang Seng Bank Tower. Google has its Shanghai offices in the Shanghai World Financial Center.

Transportation
The Shanghai Pudong International Airport opened its doors in 1999, shortening the travel time for visitors.

In the same year, Line 2 of the Shanghai Metro commenced services. An extension brought the line further east, where it serves the airport. Other lines, namely Lines 4, 6, 7, 8, 9, 11, 12, 13 and 16 also have sections that serve parts of Pudong. A magnetic levitation train began operating in 2004, moving passengers between the airport and Longyang Road Metro station.

Pudong is connected to Puxi by several tunnels and four major bridges. The first of these bridges were the Nanpu Bridge (1991) and the Yangpu Bridge (1993).  The Xupu Bridge opened in 1996. The latest of these is Lupu Bridge, which is the world's second longest arch bridge and was completed in 2002. Currently there are five tunnels that link the two sides, Dapu Rd. Tunnel, the first tunnel across the Huangpu River, Yan'an Rd. Tunnel, running east–west, and Dalian Rd. Tunnel, running north–south, Fuxing Rd. Tunnel, complementing the Yan'an Rd. Tunnel, Waihuan Tunnel, one part of Shanghai Outer Ring Express. Two new tunnels linking Lujiazui to Puxi are under construction.

Roads in Pudong have no particular longitudinal or latitudinal orientation. Major thoroughfares Pudong Avenue, Zhangyang Road and Yanggao Road run east–west until Yangpu Bridge before turning gradually to become north–south. Century Avenue crosses all three major roads and extends from Lujiazui to Century Park. Yanggao Road extends south to the A20, Shanghai's outer Ring road, which runs east–west from Xupu Bridge and then north–south beginning at the interchange near Renxi Village, when the east–west expressway turns into Yingbin Avenue, headed for Pudong International Airport.

Metro
Pudong is currently served by ten metro lines and one tram line operated by Shanghai Metro and one maglev line operated by Shanghai Maglev Train and one suburban line operated by China Railway:

 - Lujiazui , Dongchang Road, Century Avenue , Shanghai Science and Technology Museum, Century Park, Longyang Road , Zhangjiang Hi-Tech Park, Jinke Road, Guanglan Road, Tangzhen, Middle Chuangxin Road, East Huaxia Road, Chuansha, Lingkong Road, Yuandong Avenue, Haitiansan Road, Pudong International Airport 
 - Pudong Avenue , Century Avenue , Pudian Road , Lancun Road , Tangqiao
 - Gangcheng Road , North Waigaoqiao Free Trade Zone, Hangjin Road, South Waigaoqiao Free Trade Zone, Zhouhai Road, Wuzhou Avenue, Dongjing Road, Jufeng Road , Wulian Road, Boxing Road, Jinqiao Road, Yunshan Road , Deping Road, Beiyangjing Road, Minsheng Road , Yuanshen Stadium, Century Avenue , Pudian Road , Lancun Road , Shanghai Children's Medical Center, Linyi Xincun, West Gaoke Road , Dongming Road , Gaoqing Road, West Huaxia Road, Shangnan Road, South Lingyan Road, Oriental Sports Center  
 - Houtan, Changqing Road , Yaohua Road , Yuntai Road, West Gaoke Road , South Yanggao Road, Jinxiu Road, Fanghua Road, Longyang Road , Huamu Road
 - China Art Museum, Yaohua Road , Chengshan Road , Yangsi, Oriental Sports Center  , Lingzhao Xincun Station
 - Shangcheng Road, Century Avenue , Middle Yanggao Road , Fangdian Road, Lantian Road , Taierzhuang Road, Jinqiao, Jinji Road, Jinhai Road , Gutang Road, Minlei Road, Caolu
 - Shuangjiang Road, West Gaoqiao, Gaoqiao, Gangcheng Road , Jilong Road
 - Disney Resort, Kangxin Highway, Xiuyan Road, Luoshan Road , Yuqiao , Pusan Road, East Sanlin, Sanlin, Oriental Sports Center 
 - Donglu Road, Jufeng Road , North Yanggao Road, Jinjing Road, Shenjiang Road, Jinhai Road
 - Shibo Avenue, Changqing Road , Chengshan Road , Dongming Road , Huapeng Road, Xianan Road, Beicai, Chenchun Road, Lianxi Road , Middle Huaxia Road , Zhongke Road, Xuelin Road, Zhangjiang Road
 - Lujiazui , South Pudong Road, Pudong Avenue , Yuanshen Road, Changyi Road , Xiepu Road, Longju Road, Yunshan Road , Lantian Road , Huangyang Road, Yunshun Road, Pudong Football Stadium, Jinyue Road, Guiqiao Road 
 - Longyang Road , Middle Huaxia Road , Luoshan Road , East Zhoupu, Heshahangcheng, East Hangtou, Xinchang, Wild Animal Park, Huinan, East Huinan, Shuyuan, Lingang Avenue, Dishui Lake
 - Changyi Road , Minsheng Road , Middle Yanggao Road , Yingchun Road, Longyang Road , Fangxin Road, Beizhong Road, Lianxi Road , Yuqiao , Kangqiao, Zhoupu, Fanrong Road, Shenmei Road, Hetao Road, Xiasha, Hangtou
 - Longyang Road , Pudong International Airport
Zhangjiang Tram - Zhangjiang Hi-Tech Park Station, Bibo Road-Gaoke Road Station, *Huatuo Road-Daerwen Road Station, Huatuo Road Keyuan-Road Station, Cailun Road-Jinke Road Station, Cailun Road-Halei Road, Gebaini Road-Libing Road, Ziwei Road-Gaosi Road, Gaosi Road-Zhangjiang Road, Zhangjiang Middle School, Guanglan Road-Zuchongzhi Road Station, Guanglan Road=Dangui Road Station, Dangui Road-Qingtong Road, Dangui Road-Zhangdong Road, Zhangdong Road–Jinqiu Road
 - Luchaogang, Situan

Gallery

Twin towns — sister cities

Pudong is twinned with:

  Beverly Hills, California
  Kuopio

Climate 

Pudong has a humid subtropical climate (Köppen climate classification Cfa).

See also
Shanghai Premier League, amateur football (soccer) league based in Pudong

References

Further reading
 Kris Olds, “Globalizing Shanghai: The ‘Global Intelligence Corps’ and the Building of Pudong," Cities 12, no. 3 (1997) 109–23.

External links

 Pudong government website
 Pudong business site
 Flickr: Photos tagged with pudong
 Pudong Photos

 
New areas (China)
Districts of Shanghai
Special Economic Zones of China
Central business districts in China
Articles containing video clips